Moon Bay Station is a station of Line 2, Suzhou Rail Transit located in Gusu District of Suzhou. It started operation on September 24, 2016, with the opening of the Baodaiqiao South - Sangtiandao extension on Line 2.

References 

Railway stations in Jiangsu